Domenico Millelire, pseudonym of Domenico Leoni, (1761 in La Maddalena – August 14, 1827 in La Maddalena) was an Italian patriot, and officer of Regia Marina Sarda (Sardinian Royal Navy). He is recognised to have gained the first Gold Medal of Military Valor in the Italian history. Millelire gave the first defeat to Napoleon Bonaparte.

Biography
He was son of Pietro Leoni and Maria Ornano, his three brothers were Navy's officers too.
On February 23, 1793, Domenico Millelire, in command of the Sardinian fleet, defeated near the Maddalena archipelago the fleets of the French Republic which included, with the rank of lieutenant, the young and future Emperor of France Napoleon Bonaparte.
He was subsequently decorated as recompense with the gold medal of the Reign of Sardinia and a life annuity of 300 Lire.

Bibliography
 Domenico Millelire e la difesa della Sardegna nel febbraio 1793 - 11 di Collana dei quaderni azzurri - Giorgio Bardanzellu - 1954

References 

Italian sailors
Italian military personnel
Italian military personnel of the Napoleonic Wars
People from the Province of Sassari
People from the Kingdom of Sardinia
1761 births
1827 deaths